Pierre-Ernest Boivin (June 24, 1872 – December 26, 1938) was a politician and businessman. He was elected to the House of Commons of Canada in the 1926 election as a Member of the Liberal Party to represent the riding of Shefford. He was defeated in the 1930 election.

Boivin was born in Farnham, Quebec. Prior to his federal political career, he became alderman for Granby, Quebec in 1916, and then serving as mayor from 1917 until 1938.

External links
 

1872 births
1938 deaths
Liberal Party of Canada MPs
Members of the House of Commons of Canada from Quebec
Mayors of places in Quebec